The American Bantam Association is a poultry fancy association for breeders of bantam poultry. It publishes the Bantam Standard, with detailed descriptions of all the bantam breeds and varieties that it recognizes; in most – but not all – cases, these are the same as those recognised by the American Poultry Association. It also publishes a quarterly magazine and annual yearbook, hosts poultry shows and provides judges for them, and provides information on bantam breeds.

It sanctions or has sanctioned a number of poultry shows across the United States held by local groups, such as the Poultry and Rare Bird Show at the Los Angeles County Fair and the Ohio National.

History
The first president of the association was Charles E. Rockenstyie, who died in 1944.

References

Further reading 

Organizations based in New Jersey
Poultry fancy organizations